The Tuscarora Creek bridge is a  single-span, steel, through-girder bridge with a floor beam/stringer system supporting a 12-inch thick concrete slab south of Walkersville, Maryland. Originally constructed by the Frederick and Pennsylvania Line Railroad Company (F&PL) in 1872. It was later rebuilt by the Pennsylvania Railroad in 1907 as a thru girder concrete deck bridge using an older bridge from the Northern Central Railway. In 1915, the bridge was surveyed as part of the Interstate Commerce Commission's effort to establish freight rates for the Parent railroad.

As of 2021, the bridge is in active rail service, operated by the Walkersville Southern RR.

History

Construction

Bollman Iron Bridge
The original plan for the railroad called for it to cross the Monocacy River below Tuscarora Creek and therefore, no bridge was located by Gitt in 1867. The finalized location for the railroad called for a bridge over Tuscarora Creek approximately 300 feet south of the Monocacy river crossing for the road. Like the other bridges on the road, the Tuscarora Creek bridge was to be a "Bollman suspension truss" with a creek span of 63 feet, 10 feet above water. In 1872, Bollman's firm, Patapsco Bridge and Iron Works completed the bridge.

Pennsylvania Railroad Rebuilds
The ICC survey work papers  indicate one rebuild after the 1872 construction but prior to the 1915 inspection:
The Bollman iron truss span for Monocacy was replaced by the Pennsylvania railroad in 1907 but the masonry abutments were left in place.
Pennsylvania replaced the Bollman truss with a  single-span, steel, through-girder bridge. The 1915 ICC inspection reports indicate that the steel girders at that time were 3/8's of an inch in thickness and 50 inches deep. This 1907 replacement did not use new materials but instead, bridge 65.35 had been previously used by the Northern Central RR, or NCR as NCR bridge #33 built in 1882.
Subsequent to this ICC survey, Pennsylvania replaced the NCR bridge with a second thru girder bridge using 76½" deep x ⅝" thick web side girders and a 12 inch thick concrete deck. This probably occurred at the same time as the Monocacy river rebuild in 1927.
No later rebuild by PRR was made after 1927 and prior to 1982 when the bridge was conveyed to the State of Maryland..

United States Railway Administration (USRA) Rebuild
There is no evidence of a rebuild by the USRA.

State Railroad Administration (SRA 1982-1989)
Subsequent to the conveyance of the railroad from Conrail to the State of Maryland in 1982, State Railroad Administration developed a Maryland State Rail Plan.
The plan called for no action on Tuscarora Creek bridge. Currently, the Maryland Dept. of Transportation owns the bridge.

Notes

References 

Bridges in Frederick County, Maryland
Bridges completed in 1872
Railroad bridges in Maryland
Iron bridges in the United States
Plate girder bridges in the United States